Ectodysplasin-A receptor-associated adapter protein is a protein that in humans is encoded by the EDARADD gene.

Function 

This gene was identified by its association with ectodermal dysplasia, and specifically with hypohidrotic ectodermal dysplasia, a genetic disorder characterized by defective development of hair, teeth, and eccrine sweat glands. The protein encoded by this gene is a death domain-containing protein, and is found to interact with EDAR, a death domain receptor known to be required for the development of hair, teeth and other ectodermal derivatives. This protein and EDAR are coexpressed in epithelial cells during the formation of hair follicles and teeth. Through its interaction with EDAR, this protein acts as an adaptor, and links the receptor to downstream signaling pathways. Two alternatively spliced transcript variants of this gene encoding distinct isoforms have been reported.

Interactions 

EDARADD has been shown to interact with TRAF2.

References

Further reading

External links 
 GeneReview/NIH/UW entry on Hypohidrotic Ectodermal Dysplasia